is a Japanese former footballer and current manager of the Northern Mariana Islands national football team.

Managerial statistics

References

External links
 Mita Michiteru official website
 Mita Michiteru Interview
 From the Asian Pitch-JFA Official Overseas Dispatch Leader Communication-The 7th Tomoki Mita Jordan Women's Training Coach

1975 births
Living people
Association football people from Chiba Prefecture
Nippon Sport Science University alumni
Japanese footballers
Northern Mariana Islands national football team managers
Japanese expatriate sportspeople in India
Expatriate football managers in India
Association footballers not categorized by position
Japanese football managers
Expatriate football managers in the Northern Mariana Islands
Japanese expatriate football managers
Japanese expatriate sportspeople in the Northern Mariana Islands